McClellan Township may refer to one of the following townships in the United States:

 McClellan Township, Jefferson County, Illinois
 McClellan Township, Newton County, Indiana
 McClellan Township, Benson County, North Dakota

Township name disambiguation pages